Brenthis daphne, the marbled fritillary, is a butterfly of the family Nymphalidae.

Subspecies
Subspecies include:
 B. d. daphne (Europe)
 B. d. fumidia (Butler, 1882) (Korea)
 B. d. rabdia Butler, 1877 (Japan)
 B. d. ochroleuca (Fruhstorfer, 1907) (Caucasus, western Siberia)
 B. d. nikator (Fruhstorfer, 1909)
 B. d. japygia (Stauder, 1921
 B. d. iwatensis Okano, 1951 (Sakhalin, Kuril Islands)

Distribution and habitat
This widespread species is present in the Palearctic realm from the southern parts of continental Europe (northern Spain, southern France, Germany, Italy, and eastwards to Slovakia and Greece), to the Caucasus, western Siberia, Korea and Japan.

Description
Wings are rather rounded, the basic color of the upperside of the forewings is bright orange, with an incomplete black marginal band. The underside of the hindwings have a yellowish postdiscal band and the marginal area is completely suffused with purple, with a marble effect (hence the common name). The quadrangular patch on the underside hindwing is partially shaded orange pink to outer side. The chrysalis has two dorsal rows of thorns with bright spots and a bright metallic shine.

This species is very similar to the lesser marbled fritillary (Brenthis ino), but the latter is slightly smaller and the coloration of said patch is completely yellow.

Biology
The butterfly flies from late May to early August depending on the location. The eggs are laid separately in July on the leaves of the host plants. The larvae feed on brambles (Rubus fruticosus), raspberry (Rubus idaeus), Rubus caesius, Rubus sachalinensis, Sanguisorba officinalis  and Filipendula species, while adults usually feed on nectar from brambles, thistles and other flowers. This species is univoltine. It overwinters at the caterpillar stage in the egg shell.

Gallery

Bibliography
L.G. Higgins & N.D. Riley, Field Guide to the Butterflies of Britain and Europe, London, Collins, 1980, p. 109, 
Novak & F.Severa, Field Guide in Color to Butterflies and Moths, Octopus, 1981, .
T.Tolman & R.Lewington, Guida alle farfalle d'Europa e Nord Africa, 2014, 
Tolman T., Lewington R. Collins Field Guide Butterflies of Britain & Europe — London: Harper Collins Publishers, 1997.— 320 p., 106 col. Pl
VK Tuzov, Guide to Butterflies of the Palearctic Region, G C Bozano, 2003, pp. 46–7,

References

External links

Butterflies of Europe 
 Paolo Mazzei, Daniel Morel, Raniero Panfili Moths and Butterflies of Europe and North Africa
 Lepiforum.de

Argynnini
Butterflies of Europe
Butterflies described in 1780